Small Talk is the seventh album by Sly and the Family Stone, released by Epic/CBS Records in 1974. This album was the final LP to feature the original Family Stone, which broke up in January 1975.

Small Talk's singles were "Time for Livin'" (the band's final Top 40 hit) and "Loose Booty", an up-tempo funk track which uses the names of Bible characters Shadrach, Meshach and Abednego as a chant. Pictured on the album cover with bandleader Sly Stone in a photograph by Norman Seeff are his then-wife Kathleen Silva and his son Sylvester Jr.

In addition to its standard stereo release, Small Talk was also released in quadraphonic sound.

Beastie Boys sampled the words Shadrach, Meshach, Abednego from "Loose Booty" on their track "Shadrach" from the album Paul's Boutique (1989). Beastie Boys also recorded a hardcore punk version of "Time for Livin" for their 1992 album Check Your Head, along with an accompanying music video.

Music and lyrics
The album is more mellow and restful than earlier efforts, critic Alex Stimmel observes. Prominence of strings distinguishes the album from earlier recordings by the band, and violin player Sid Page is credited as a band member. According to critic Alex Stimmel, the string section is used to "cushion the mood, augment vocal lines, create melodies, or sting riffs once reserved for horns." Stimmel writes that this aspect of the music shows Sly Stone as "the producer-genius that he was." Other than that, the album has a spare sound in comparison to the band's earlier records. More than half the tracks include studio chatter, which according to Stimmel makes for "an air of spontaneity from the sessions, as if the tape was just rolling and the band was finally having a good time again." In addition to the single releases, other hard funk counterpoints to the mellow tunes are "Can't Strain My Brain" and "Better Thee Than Me".

Some lyrics reflect familial love, Stone having been recently married, yet the message music characteristic of the band's '60s hits returns for the last time in the "raucous, vengeful 'Time for Livin'".

Artwork
The cover of the album showed a picture of Stone, his wife Kathleen Silva, and baby Sly Jr. On 5 June 1974, the pair were married onstage at Madison Square Garden; the marriage lasted five months.

Critical reception 

Reviewing the original LP for Let It Rock in 1974, Pete Wingfield said Small Talk follows mostly in the vein of the band's previous album, Fresh (1973) – "a little mellower, happier, more together maybe. Certainly more so than on Riot – the sniffing self-pity of that period has mercifully gone; a couple of cuts even approach the 'up' feel of [Stone's] early hits."

Less impressed was Village Voice critic Robert Christgau, who said, "Although you can hear different, you'd almost think Sly's sense of rhythm had abandoned him, because his first flop is a bellywhopper—its scant interest verbal, its only memorable song a doowop takeoff." Years later in Rolling Stone, he rated the CD reissue somewhat higher, but wrote that the album marked for Stone "the beginning of an end that proceeded through many false comebacks to yesterday, today and tomorrow."

Track listing
All tracks written by Sylvester "Sly Stone" Stewart, except for "Small Talk", written by Sylvester Stewart and W. Silva. All songs produced and arranged by Sly Stone for Fresh Productions.

Side one
"Small Talk" – 3:22
"Say You Will" – 3:19
"Mother Beautiful" – 2:01
"Time for Livin'" – 3:17
"Can't Strain My Brain" – 4:09

Side two
"Loose Booty" – 3:47
"Holdin' On" – 3:39
"Wishful Thinkin'" – 4:26
"Better Thee Than Me" – 3:35
"Livin' While I'm Livin'" – 2:58
"This is Love" – 2:54

CD bonus tracks
Added for 2007 limited edition compact disc reissue:

 "Crossword Puzzle" (early version)
 "Time for Livin'" (alternate take)
 "Loose Booty" (alternate take)
 "Positive" (previously unreleased instrumental)

Personnel

Sly and the Family Stone 
 Sly Stone – vocals, organ, guitar, piano, harmonica, and more
 Freddie Stone – backing vocals, guitar
 Rose Stone – backing vocals, piano, keyboards
 Cynthia Robinson – trumpet
 Jerry Martini – saxophone
 Pat Rizzo – saxophone
 Sid Page – violin
 Rusty Allen – bass guitar
 Andy Newmark, Bill Lordan – drums
 Little Sister (Vet Stone, Mary McCreary, Elva Mouton) – backing vocals

Additional personnel 
 Karat Faye – engineer
 Ed Bogas – string arranger
 Norman Seeff – cover photography
 John Berg, John Van Hamersveld – design

References

Further reading

External links
 Sly and the Family Stone - Small Talk (1974) album review by Rob Bowman, credits & releases on AllMusic
 Sly and the Family Stone - Small Talk (1974) album releases & credits on Discogs.com
 Sly and the Family Stone - Small Talk (1974) album to be listened as stream on Spotify.com

1974 albums
Sly and the Family Stone albums
Epic Records albums
Albums with cover art by John Van Hamersveld